Pseudoanthidium prionognathum is a species of bee belonging to the family Megachilidae, formerly placed into its own genus, Gnathanthidium. The species is found in Southern Africa.

References

Megachilidae